Alwar Lok Sabha constituency is one of the 25 Lok Sabha (parliamentary) constituencies in Rajasthan state in India. Alwar Lok Sabha seat is dominated by Yadavs.

Assembly segments
Presently, Alwar Lok Sabha constituency comprises eight Vidhan Sabha (legislative assembly) segments. These are:

Members of Parliament

Election Results

See also
 Alwar district
 List of Constituencies of the Lok Sabha

Notes

External links
Alwar lok sabha  constituency election 2019 result details

Lok Sabha constituencies in Rajasthan
Alwar district